The 2018 AFC Futsal Championship qualification was the qualification process organized by the Asian Football Confederation (AFC) to determine the participating teams for the 2018 AFC Futsal Championship, the 15th edition of the international men's futsal championship of Asia.

A total of 16 teams qualified to play in the final tournament, including Chinese Taipei who qualified automatically as hosts.

The qualification process was divided into four zones, where the ASEAN Zone doubled as the 2017 AFF Futsal Championship, the East Zone and West Zone was played in Thailand, and the South Zone was merged to Central Zone as Nepal was the only team from South Zone.

Qualification process
Of the 47 AFC member associations, a total of 29 teams entered the competition. The 16 spots in the final tournament are distributed as follows:
Host : 1 spot
ASEAN Zone : 4 spots
South & Central Zone : 4 spots (the two zones were merged since Nepal was the only team from South Zone)
West Zone : 4 spots
East Zone : 3 spots

As the final tournament hosts had not been announced at the time of the qualifying draw, the hosts Chinese Taipei were also included in the draw. Despite having automatically qualified for the final tournament, they may still decide to participate in qualification, and if they finish in one of the qualification spots, the next best team in their zone (East) advances to play-off.

Draw

Seeding

AFF Draw
The original draw for the 2017 AFF Futsal Championship was held on 17 February 2017, 10:00 MMT (UTC+06:30) during the AFF Council Meeting at the Novotel Yangon Max Hotel in Yangon, Myanmar. After Australia withdrew from the competition, a re-draw was held on 23 September 2017 during the AFF Council Meeting in Bali, Indonesia.

The teams were seeded according to their performance in the 2016 AFF Futsal Championship tournament.

Notes
(*) Not vying for qualification but will still play matches.
Teams in bold qualified for the final tournament.

AFC Draw
The draw was held on 6 July 2017, 15:00 MYT (UTC+8), at the AFC House in Kuala Lumpur, Malaysia, except for the ASEAN Zone which uses the 2017 AFF Futsal Championship as their qualification tournament and whose draw had already been held. The mechanism for each zone is as follows:
East Zone : seven teams from East Asia, were drawn into one group of four teams and one group of three teams.
South & Central Zone : seven teams from South Asia and Central Asia, were drawn into one group of four teams and one group of three teams.
West Zone : eight teams from West Asia, were drawn into two groups of four teams.

The teams were seeded according to their performance in the 2016 AFC Futsal Championship final tournament and qualification.

Notes
Teams in bold qualified for the final tournament.

Format
In each group, teams play each other once at a centralised venue; except ASEAN Zone, South & Central Zone.

Tiebreakers
Teams are ranked according to points (3 points for a win, 1 point for a draw, 0 points for a loss), and if tied on points, the following tiebreaking criteria are applied, in the order given, to determine the rankings (Regulations Article 11.5):
Points in head-to-head matches among tied teams;
Goal difference in head-to-head matches among tied teams;
Goals scored in head-to-head matches among tied teams;
If more than two teams are tied, and after applying all head-to-head criteria above, a subset of teams are still tied, all head-to-head criteria above are reapplied exclusively to this subset of teams;
Goal difference in all group matches;
Goals scored in all group matches;
Penalty shoot-out if only two teams are tied and they met in the last round of the group;
Disciplinary points (yellow card = 1 point, red card as a result of two yellow cards = 3 points, direct red card = 3 points, yellow card followed by direct red card = 4 points);
Drawing of lots.

ASEAN Zone

The (AFC) matches were played between 26 October and 30 October 2017.
All matches were held in Vietnam.
Times listed are UTC+7.
In the event the Philippines, Timor Leste or both finish among the top two teams in their group the next best team/s qualify for the final tournament instead since both countries did not submit their entries for the 2018 AFC Futsal Championship.

Group A

Group B

Semi-finals

Third place match

Final

East Zone
The matches were played between 4 and 8 November 2017.
All matches are held in Thailand.
Times listed are UTC+7.

Group A

Group B

Play-off
Winner qualified for 2018 AFC Futsal Championship.

South & Central Zone
The matches were played between 15 and 17 October 2017.
All matches are held in Iran.
Times listed are (IRST +3:30).

Group A

Group B

West Zone
The matches were played between 10 and 12 November 2017.
All matches are held in Thailand.
Times listed are UTC+7.

Group A

Group B

Qualified teams
The following 16 teams qualified for the final tournament.

1 Bold indicates champions for that year. Italic indicates hosts for that year.

Goalscorers

References

External links
, the-AFC.com
AFC Futsal Championship 2018, stats.the-AFC.com

Qualification
2018
qualification
October 2017 sports events in Asia
November 2017 sports events in Asia